Fight School is a British reality television series broadcast between 19 September and 21 November 2002. It was made by Granada Television for Sky One.

Filmed in China, it followed a group of martial arts practitioners through a variety of stamina and endurance tasks to determine a winner. Each week one contestant was eliminated after a mixed martial arts bout.

The Fight School contestants were (in eviction order) Andrew Spink, Dominica Oatley, Susan Reilly, Danny Ho, Alex Campbell (left through injury), Don Klass, Alex Hart (known as Allie), M Saville, Toby Russell (replaced Alex Campbell), Emma Ashford and Paul Bernard (winner)

One of the contestants, Don Klass, is the brother of television personality and musician Myleene Klass. The eventual winner was Master Paul Bernard who is World Kickboxing Champion. M Saville recently took part in the newly revamped Gladiators show on Sky One as one of the contestants. Andrew Spink, Alex Hart, M Saville and Paul Bernard all run Martial Arts schools around the uk.

A second series was planned but was cancelled pre-production because of the SARS outbreak which affected South China in 2002–2003.

Contestants
The 11 fighters competing were:

References

External links

Information on UKGameshows.com

2002 British television series debuts
2002 British television series endings
2000s British reality television series
Sky UK original programming
Martial arts television series
Television series by ITV Studios
English-language television shows
Television shows set in China